This is a list of Islamic prophets buried in Iran.

East Azerbaijan Province, Iran
 Gurjee (جرجیس) - Jolfa city, village of Shah Golfarak valley, Kaghi Key
 Younis (یونس) - Marand County  

Isfahan province
 Isaiah (شعیا) - Isfahan; Some muslims believe buried in Isaiah mausoleumwhich is part of the Imamzadeh Ismail religious complex located in the Old Jewish Quarter, Isfahan, Iran. 
 Serah - Pir Bakran, near Esfahan, Iran

Tehran Province
 Samuel - Samuel's tomb is located 30 km outside Saveh City, Iran

Khuzestan Province
 Daniel (دانیال) - Susa, in southern Iran, at a site known as Shush-e Daniyal
Zanjan province
 Qedarite (قیدار) - Qeydar, Zanjan, Iran

Semnan
 Jeremiah (ارمیا) - the city of Shahrood, Miami, the village of Jeremiah, some claim Harris County, West Benghazi, Gigah Village.

Qazvin province
 Salam, Solum, Al-Qiya and Sohuli - Peighambarieh shrine, Qazvin.

Golestan province
 Khalid ibn Sinan (خالد بن سنان) - Gonbad Kavous city, Gachi Sou village, cemetery and shrine of Khalid Nabi

Hamedan province
 Habakkuk (حیقوق) - located at Toyserkan, Iran.

References 

Iran religion-related lists
Prophecy in Islam
Prophets buried in Iran
Lists of Muslims